Lionel Henry Daiches (8 March 1911 – 11 November 1999), was a Scottish QC and Liberal Party politician.

Background

Daiches was the son of Dr Salis Daiches, a rabbi of the Edinburgh Jewish congregation. He was educated at George Watson's College and Edinburgh University. In 1947 he married Dorothy Estelle Bernstein. They had two sons. His younger brother David Daiches was a noted writer. He also had two sisters, Sylvia and Beryl Daiches.

In later life he lived at 10 Heriot Row in central Edinburgh.

Professional career
Daiches practised as a solicitor before being admitted a member of the Faculty of Advocates in 1946. He became a QC in 1956.

Political career
Daiches wrote many articles arguing the identical nature of Bolshevism and Fascism. He was Liberal candidate for the Edinburgh South division at the 1950 General Election. It was not a promising seat and no Liberal had contested the division since 1929. In a difficult election year for the Liberals, he came third;

He did not stand for parliament again.

External links 
Guardian Obituary: https://www.theguardian.com/news/1999/nov/18/guardianobituaries

References

1911 births
1999 deaths
Liberal Party (UK) parliamentary candidates
Jewish British politicians
People educated at George Watson's College
Alumni of the University of Edinburgh